The 1988–89 Fulham RLFC season was the ninth in the club's history. They competed in the 1988–89 Second Division of the Rugby Football League. They also competed in the 1989 Challenge Cup, 1988–89 Lancashire Cup and the 1988–89 League Cup. They finished the season in 15th place in the second tier of British professional rugby league.

1988-89 Second Division table

1988-89 squad

References

External links
Rugby League Project

London Broncos seasons
London Broncos season
1988 in rugby league by club
1988 in English rugby league
London Broncos season
1989 in rugby league by club
1989 in English rugby league